Below is a list of the premiers of the province of Ontario, Canada, since Confederation in 1867. Ontario uses a unicameral Westminster-style parliamentary government, in which the premier is the leader of the party that controls the most seats in the Legislative Assembly. The premier is Ontario's head of government. The premier picks a cabinet from the elected members to form the Executive Council of Ontario, and presides over that body.

Members are first elected to the legislature during general elections. General elections must be conducted every four years from the date of the last election. An election may also happen if the Governing party loses the confidence of the legislature, by the defeat of a supply bill or tabling of a confidence motion.

This article only covers the time since the Canadian Confederation was created in 1867. For the premiers of Canada West from 1840 to 1867, see List of joint premiers of the Province of Canada.

The 26th and current premier of Ontario is Doug Ford of the Progressive Conservative Party of Ontario since June 29, 2018.

Premiers of Ontario since 1867

See also
 Politics of Ontario
 List of leaders of the opposition in Ontario
 List of premiers of Ontario by time in office
For more lists of this type, see Lists of incumbents.

Notes

References

Ontario

Premiers

fr:Liste des Premiers ministres de l'Ontario